Battle of Bila Tserkva (or of Biała Cerkiew) may refer to:

Battle of Bila Tserkva (1626)
Battle of Bila Tserkva (1651)

See also 
The Treaty of Bila Tserkva, signed in 1651, after the 1651 Battle of Bila Tserkva